Lal Pahare'r Katha, is a 2007 Indian Bengali-language film directed by Remo D'Souza, starring Mithun Chakraborty, Rishi, Shankar Chakravarty, Diya and Piyali. After choreographing songs in more than 100 films in last eight years, Remo turned director with this Bengali film, which has been screened at the Dubai International Film Festival. Remo's wife Lizelle D'Souza has produced the film.

Cast 
Mithun Chakraborty
Rishi
Shankar Chakraborty
Shankar Debnath
Rimjhim
Bidipta Chakraborty
Moumita Gupta
Kayyum
Diya  
Piyali
 Shankhanil
Kamal Chakravarty

Release
Lal Pahare'r Katha was released in 2007, but not in India. Remo said "I made my first Bengali film based on Chhau dance - a traditional Indian tribal art form and won lot of appreciation for it in countries like US, Germany etc, but in India, nobody released that film because no one wants to watch Indian classical forms."

References

External links
 

2007 films
Bengali-language Indian films
2000s Bengali-language films
Films directed by Remo D'Souza